Rabenstein Castle may refer to: 

In Austria:
Rabenstein Castle (Carinthia), castle ruins near Sankt Paul im Lavanttal
Rabenstein Castle (Lower Austria), castle ruins in Rabenstein an der Pielach
Rabenstein Castle (Styria), a castle in Frohnleiten
Rabenstein Castle (Tyrol), castle ruins in Virgen

In the Czech Republic:
Rabenštejn Castle, a castle in Vrbno pod Pradědem

In Germany:
Rabenstein Castle (Upper Franconia), a castle in Ahorntal, Bavaria
Rabenstein Castle (Brandenburg), a castle in Rabenstein/Fläming in the Potsdam-Mittelmark District
Rabenstein Castle (Riedenburg), castle ruins in Riedenburg, Bavaria
Rabenstein Castle (Rhön), castle ruins in the Rhön Mountains
Rabenstein Castle (Saxony), a castle in the Chemnitz suburb of Rabenstein
Rabenstein Castle (Wirsberg), castle ruins in Wirsberg, Bavaria

See also

 Rabenstein
 Rabenstein an der Pielach
 Rabenstein (Kellerwald)